{{DISPLAYTITLE:Δ7-Prednisolone}}

Δ7-Prednisolone, or 7-dehydroprednisolone, is a synthetic glucocorticoid corticosteroid which was never marketed.

References

Diketones
Glucocorticoids
Pregnanes
Triols